Governor Perdue may refer to:

 Bev Perdue (born 1947), governor of North Carolina (2009-2013)
 Sonny Perdue (born 1946), governor of Georgia (2003-2011)

See also
 Perdue (surname)